{{Speciesbox
| image = Rytidosperma caespitosum - Flickr - Kevin Thiele.jpg
| genus = Rytidosperma
| species = caespitosum
| authority = (Gaudich.) Connor & Edgar
| synonyms_ref = 
| synonyms = *Austrodanthonia caespitosa (Gaudich.) H.P.Linder Danthonia caespitosa Gaudich.
}}Rytidosperma caespitosum, known by various common names including common wallaby-grass, ringed wallaby-grass, and white-top, is a species of grass native to southern parts of Australia.

Description
It is a tufted perennial grass that reaches up to 90 centimetres high. Glumes are green with or without purple, and occur in a panicle of from 10 to 30 spikelets, each of which contains from four to nine individual flowers.

Taxonomy
It was first collected from Shark Bay in Western Australia by Charles Gaudichaud-Beaupré, botanist to the expedition of Louis de Freycinet. It was published by Gaudichaud-Beaupré in 1829 under the name Danthonia caespitosa. During the 1960s and 1970s it was transferred firstly by Zotov into Notodanthonia and then by Connor & Edgar into Rytidosperma. In 1993 it was transferred into Austrodanthonia'' by Hans Peter Linder. However, in 2010 Austrodanthonia was again submerged into a broader Rytidosperma, and all Austrodanthonia species are now considered part of the genus Rytidosperma.

Distribution and habitat
It occurs throughout the wetter, cooler parts of southern Australia, through to hot, arid land such as Shark Bay. Its many forms span diverse habitats, variously tolerating a range of salinity and soils, including sands, loams, limestone, granite and laterite.  It is considered one of the main native pasture grasses in southern Australia

Ecology
Flowering occurs in spring or summer, usually in response to rain.

References

Danthonioideae
Poales of Australia
Angiosperms of Western Australia
Flora of South Australia
Flora of Victoria (Australia)
Flora of Tasmania
Flora of New South Wales
Flora of the Australian Capital Territory